Svetoslav Barkanichkov (born 1 March 1974) is a Bulgarian footballer.

Club career

Born in Pleven, Barkanichkov has been a squad member of numerous clubs in the top division of Bulgarian football, most notably becoming champion of Bulgaria twice - in 2001 (with Levski Sofia) and in 2004 (with Loko Plovdiv). In the mid to late 2000s, he also donned the shirt of teams from Poland.

International career

In 2001, after having impressed Uzbek scouts during an Albena Cup match between Levski Sofia and Uzbekistan, Barkanichkov received a lucrative financial offer to represent the Central Asian country's national team, but refused it, as he was at the time on then manager of Bulgaria Stoycho Mladenov's radar. Eventually he never got to play international football, as he was plagued by injury problems during the year 2001.

Personal

Barkanichkov is presently employed as a fitness instructor in Pleven in addition to continuing to play football at the amateur level in Bulgaria. In 2009 and 2014, he was a participant in the 4th and 5th seasons of Survivor, receiving praise for his performance. Barkanichkov is married and has a son. He is a fan of Premier League team Southampton, with Matthew Le Tissier being one of his football idols. Barkanichkov is a huge enthusiast regarding vampires.

References

External links
 
  
 Profile at LevskiSofia.info

1974 births
Living people
Bulgarian footballers
Association football midfielders
Sportspeople from Pleven
PFC Levski Sofia players
PFC Spartak Pleven players
PFC Lokomotiv Plovdiv players
PFC Cherno More Varna players
Neftochimic Burgas players
PFC Svetkavitsa players
Korona Kielce players
ŁKS Łódź players
Radomiak Radom players
First Professional Football League (Bulgaria) players
Expatriate footballers in Poland
Bulgarian expatriate sportspeople in Poland
Bulgarian expatriate footballers